Virine is a village in the municipality of Ćuprija, Serbia. According to the 2002 census, the village has a population of 884 people.

References

Populated places in Pomoravlje District